"Forget About the World" is a song by English singer Gabrielle. It was written by Gabrielle along with Ben Barson, Andy Dean, and Ben Wolff for her self-titled second album (1996). "Forget About the World" did not perform as well as its predecessor "Give Me a Little More Time", peaking at number 23 on the UK Singles Chart. It was the lowest-charting single from Gabrielle.

The release included a remix by French electronic music duo Daft Punk. On their Alive 2006/2007 concert tour they created a mashup with "Aerodynamic", which was later released on the Alive 2007 live album.

Track listings

Charts

References

1996 songs
Gabrielle (singer) songs
Songs written by Gabrielle (singer)
Music videos directed by Howard Greenhalgh